'Florin Popenţiu Vlădicescu' is Professor of Software Engineering.

Career
He is an associated Professor at University "Politehnica" of Bucharest and since the academic year of 1997/98, he has been appointed as "UNESCO professor" at City University, London. Before that, he was a visiting professor at a number of renowned European technical universities such as the ENST- Telecom ParisTech , the ETH-Zurich or Technical University of Denmark.
Prof. Florin POPENTIU VLÃDICESCU has published over 100 papers in International Journals and Conference Proceedings and is co-author of 4 books.

He has worked for many years on problems associated with software reliability and has been Co-Director of two NATO research projects involving collaboration with partner institutions throughout Europe. He is on advisory board of several international journals, Reliability and Risk Analysis: Theory & Applications  and Microelectronics and Reliability  . He is reviewer for ACM Computing Reviews , IJCSIS , and Associated Editor to IJICT  .

Also he is a member of ENBIS , IEE, IEEE and IEEE Communications Society. Dr. Florin POPENTIU has been elected Fellow of the Academy of Romanian Scientists  in 2008. He is EU Expert for H2020  and ALL EU Programme  . His Research ID is E-5787-2010 . Also in 2009 he has been nominated UNESCO Expert  in the field of Higher Education, Research and Knowledge.

Prof. Florin POPENTIU VLÃDICESCU is currently Visiting Professor at "ParisTech" which includes the "Grandes Ecoles", The ATHENS Programme[], where he teaches courses on Software Reliability  . He also lectures on Software Reliability at International Master of Science in Computer Systems Engineering - Technical University of Denmark  .

Charitable Activities

Professor Florin POPENTIU VLÃDICESCU is Chairman of the following Charitable Trusts:Academie des Arts "Elena Teodorini , "Elena Teodorini" Academy of Arts and Sciences - London  and "Elena Teodorini" Foundation-Bucharest

References

1. UNESCO Chairholder, 

2. Total Quality for Software Engineering Management, Springer,  

3. Software Reliability - DTU

Links

1.Elena Teodorini :Georges Bizet "Carmen, opera (Habanera)" record 1903 

2.Elena Teodorini :Gaetano Donizetti "Lucrezia Borgia, opera (Rondo)" record 1903 

3.Elena Teodorini :Gaetano Donizetti "Lucrezia Borgia, opera (M'odi, ah m'odi)" record 1903 

4.Elena Teodorini :Amilcare Ponchielli "La Gioconda, opera in 4 acts (Preghiera)" record 1903 

5.Elena Teodorini :Amilcare Ponchielli "La Gioconda, opera in 4 acts (Parla (Arditi))" record 1903 

6.Elena Teodorini & Bidu Sayão

Popentiu Vladisceanu, Florin
Living people
1950 births